In the mathematical field of group theory, Lagrange's theorem is a theorem that states that for any finite group , the order (number of elements) of every subgroup of  divides the order of . The theorem is named after Joseph-Louis Lagrange.

Proof 
Each left coset  has the same cardinality as  because  defines a bijection  (the inverse is ).
The number of left cosets is the index .
By the previous three sentences,

Extension 

Therefore, we can recover the original equation .

Applications 
If the group has  elements, it follows

This can be used to prove Fermat's little theorem and its generalization, Euler's theorem.  These special cases were known long before the general theorem was proved.

The theorem also shows that any group of prime order is cyclic and simple, since the subgroup generated by any non-identity element must be the whole group itself.

Hence , contradicting the assumption that  is the largest prime.

Existence of subgroups of given order 
Lagrange's theorem raises the converse question as to whether every divisor of the order of a group is the order of some subgroup. This does not hold in general: given a finite group G and a divisor d of |G|, there does not necessarily exist a subgroup of G with order d. The smallest example is A4 (the alternating group of degree 4), which has 12 elements but no subgroup of order 6.

A "Converse of Lagrange's Theorem" (CLT) group is a finite group with the property that for every divisor of the order of the group, there is a subgroup of that order.  It is known that a CLT group must be solvable and that every supersolvable group is a CLT group. However, there exist solvable groups that are not CLT (for example, A4) and CLT groups that are not supersolvable (for example, S4, the symmetric group of degree 4).

There are partial converses to Lagrange's theorem.  For general groups, Cauchy's theorem guarantees the existence of an element, and hence of a cyclic subgroup, of order any prime dividing the group order. Sylow's theorem extends this to the existence of a subgroup of order equal to the maximal power of any prime dividing the group order.  For solvable groups,  Hall's theorems assert the existence of a subgroup of order equal to any unitary divisor of the group order (that is, a divisor coprime to its cofactor).

Counterexample of the converse of Lagrange's theorem 
The converse of Lagrange's theorem states that if  is a divisor of the order of a group , then there exists a subgroup  where .

We will examine the alternating group , the set of even permutations as the subgroup of the Symmetric group .

Let  be the non-cyclic subgroup of  called the Klein four-group.

.

Let .

Assume , then .

This is impossible since pairs of elements must be even and cannot total up to 5 elements. Thus, the assumptions that  is wrong, so .

Note that the cosets generated by a subgroup of a group form a partition of the group. The cosets generated by a specific subgroup are either identical to each other or disjoint. The index of a subgroup in a group  is the number of cosets generated by that subgroup.

Because of that, . Since .

Transforming back, we get . Hence, .

But earlier we assumed that , so we have a contradiction.

Q.E.D.

History 
Lagrange himself did not prove the theorem in its general form. Note that 3 is a factor of 6.) The number of such polynomials is the index in the symmetric group  of the subgroup  of permutations that preserve the polynomial. So the size of  divides . With the later development of abstract groups, this result of Lagrange on polynomials was recognized to extend to the general theorem about finite groups which now bears his name.

In 1844, Augustin-Louis Cauchy proved Lagrange's theorem for the symmetric group .

Camille Jordan finally proved Lagrange's theorem for the case of any permutation group in 1861.

Notes

References

External links 
 

Theorems about finite groups
Articles containing proofs